William M. Day (1867–1923), was a Major League Baseball pitcher who played in  and  with the Philadelphia Quakers/Phillies and the Pittsburgh Alleghenys. He was still playing professionally in the minor leagues through 1904.

External links

References

1867 births
1923 deaths
People from Marcus Hook, Pennsylvania
Major League Baseball pitchers
Baseball players from Pennsylvania
Philadelphia Quakers players
Philadelphia Phillies players
Pittsburgh Alleghenys players
Troy Trojans (minor league) players
Reading Actives players
New Bedford Whalers (baseball) players
Syracuse Stars (minor league baseball) players
New Bedford Browns players
Brockton Shoemakers players
Bridgeport Orators players
Rome Romans players
Fall River Indians players
Lowell Tigers players
19th-century baseball players
Sportspeople from Delaware County, Pennsylvania